The Kangaroos may refer to the following:

Australia national rugby league team, also known as the Kangaroos
North Melbourne Football Club, also known as The Kangaroos
The Fabulous Kangaroos, an Australian professional wrestling team
The Royal Kangaroos, a professional wrestling tag team

See also
 Kangaroo (disambiguation)